Korolenko Chernihiv Regional Universal Scientific Library (Ukrainian: Чернігівська обласна універсальна наукова бібліотека імені В. Г. Короленка) – in Chernihiv (Ukraine); library-bibliographic, cultural-educational and local lore, scientific-methodical center of Chernihiv region. It is the main and largest library in the region. Among its founders - OA Tyshchynsky, Sofia and Oleksandr Rusovi, P.P. Chervinsky, OM Borsuk, OP Karpinsky, MO Константинович, К.Д. Miloradovich, V.Ye. Varzar, I.G. Rashevsky, IL Shrag, P.S. Yefimenko and Ishi. In 1922, the library was named after the Russian writer Vladimir Korolenko, which is now disputed by the city community. The general fund of the library has 868 thousand copies. In the structure of the fund 83% of scientific, special, educational, reference and popular science publications. Up to 600 titles of Ukrainian and foreign publications are subscribed. In the fund of rare editions of the XIX - the beginning of the XX more than 15 thousand editions.

The library is located in the historic building of the Noble and Peasant Land Bank (1910–13) at the address: Peace Avenue, bldg. 41, Chernihiv.

History

Origin
The Chernihiv Public Library was opened on March 15 (28), 1877 on the basis of the Statute approved by the Minister of Internal Affairs of the Russian Empire. The institution was founded by a group of the city's intelligentsia, including Oleksandr Tyshchynsky, Sofia and Oleksandr Rusovy, Petro Chervinsky, OM Borsuk, OP Karpinsky, MO Konstantinovich, KD Miloradovich, Vasyl Varzar, and Ivan Rashevsky. Ilya Shrag, Petro Yefimenko, MF Lindfors, the Kotsyubynskys and Hrinchenkos, Mykola Voronyi, Hryhoriy Kovalenko, etc. are also involved in the library's activities in the first period of its existence.

The original form of existence of the library was a "newspaper reading room". A year later, on February 18, 1878, by the decision of the founders at the reading room, the library was opened. The books were donated to her by the founders themselves - in particular, Oleksandr Tyshchynsky and Stepan Nis donated their own libraries for public use, and part of their collection was donated by the Rusovs. Donations for the maintenance of the institution and the purchase of new books also came from other members of the board, various cultural institutions, and over time - from payment for the use of books. At the end of the first year of operation, the library fund amounted to 564 books.

For the first 8 years, the library did not have its own premises. A separate house on Preobrazhenskaya Street was allocated by the city council only in 1895 under public pressure.

The revival of the library's work was facilitated by the inclusion of Mykhailo Kotsyubynsky, Mykola Vorony, and other writers in its board. Chernihiv Ukrainian Hromada and Prosvita provided great assistance. Then the library organized folk readings, public lectures, concerts. The anti-imperial intelligentsia united around the institution. The appearance of such a Ukrainian cultural center caused dissatisfaction of the Russian authorities, and on the basis of a formal reason - the discovery of illegal literature - in 1909 the Russians closed the library.

But the very next (1910) the library opened under a new name - the City Library (an institution that belonged to the city government).

The library during the UPR and the Bolshevik occupation 
During the UPR, the Library functioned successfully, being protected by the laws of the Ukrainian State. But after the occupation of the Ukrainian People's Republic, the Russians resorted to the liquidation of city self-government and handed over all educational institutions to the so-called Narosvit, and on January 12, 1919, the occupiers stopped the library's operation altogether. The book fund began to be forcibly replenished with ideological Russian literature, and the library was maintained at the expense of the occupying authorities. In July of the same year, the Russians talked about opening a central "exemplary provincial library."

In 1920, the library began working in a new building on the street, which was renamed Sovetskaya. In 1921, as a result of the fire provoked by the communists, many property and valuable literature perished, so the library began to function regularly only in 1922. At the same time, she was given the name Korolenko without discussion or justification.

The regional library became known as the "state" library immediately after the Holodomor - in 1934. Since then, it has become a center of methodological, bibliographic and local lore work of the Chernihiv region, but at the same time a center of ideological influence on the occupied population of Ukraine.

On August 24, 1941, the library was destroyed - its 216,000 holdings and property were completely destroyed. The German authorities restored the Library, concentrating 148,000 volumes from various city libraries that had not been looted or destroyed during the communist invasion. However, in 1943 the Russians burned this fund again. Formally, the work of the library during the new communist occupation was resumed on December 1, 1943.

Second World War
After the Second World War, the main library of Chernihiv slowly recovered, increased its holdings at the expense of Russian literature, and established cultural and educational activities. At first, it was housed in the premises at 60 Popudrenko Street and Yelets Monastery, and since 1974 it has been housed in the current building at 41 Lenina Street (now Peace Avenue). A copy of the building is the building of the Penza Regional Art Gallery.

On the occasion of the 100th anniversary of its founding in 1977, the library was awarded the Diploma of the Verkhovna Rada of the USSR.

On June 30, 2018, the library's funds in the basement were flooded after a heavy downpour. The water level was 1.65 m. The binders of 3,000 local periodicals were affected, as well as about 26,000 art publications.

In the 2000s, the Chernihiv Regional Universal Scientific Library was a significant book depository of the region, a cultural, educational, scientific and information institution that provides accumulation and use of printed publications, a scientific and methodological center of public libraries, a center that coordinates library activities in the region. The library is an accompanying educational base for students of Chernihiv universities.

Russian invasion of Ukraine (2022)

On 30 March 2022, during the Siege of Chernihiv, the Library was bombed, along with the market in the city center.

General Data 
The mode of operation of the library: from 9.30 to 20.00 from Monday to Thursday, Friday - a day off, on Saturdays and Sundays - from 10.00 to 18.00. It offers readers a common and 6 specialized reading rooms, 2 internet centers with free Wi-Fi access. There are about 30 different clubs in the library, literary evenings, exhibitions, presentations and conferences are constantly held.

Literature 
 Ukrainian Soviet Encyclopedia

Gallery

References

External links

Tourist attractions in Chernihiv
Libraries in Ukraine
Buildings and structures in Chernihiv
Education in Chernihiv
Library buildings completed in 1977
Religious buildings and structures in Chernihiv
Tourism in Chernihiv
Libraries in Chernihiv
Buildings and structures destroyed during the 2022 Russian invasion of Ukraine